Basumatary or Basumatari is a surname found among the Boro people of north-eastern India. Basumatary comes from the word Basumati-ároi, meaning Earth-folk. The members of the clan cannot bury their dead or erect a funeral pyre without paying a token amount to Mother Earth through Basumatarys . Basumatary is derived from the Hindu earth goddess Basumati( Bhudevi ), consort of Varaha( third incarnation of Vishnu). She is the mythical mother of Boro people .

The mythical dynasty of Boros, the Bhauma dynasty derived its name from Bhudevi/basumati. Bhauma dynasty was founded by mythical Bārā/Bara hari/Boro king Narakasura, the son of Baraha and Basumati. All Kamrupa kings drew their lineage from Narakasura and called themselves as Baraha-pati(king of Boros).

Notable people
People with this surname include:
Hagrama Mohilary (alias Hagrama Basumatary) - Chief of Bodoland Territorial Council.
Hitesh Basumatary - Indian politician.
Sansuma Khunggur Bwiswmuthiary - Indian politician in Lok Sabha.
Rajni Basumatary - Indian actress and filmmaker.

See also
Bodo people
Bodo Sahitya Sabha
Bodo language
Narzary

References

Occupational surnames
Surnames of Indian origin
Bodo-language surnames